Giuseppe Olivieri (28 February 1889 – 22 May 1973) was an Italian racing cyclist. He won stage 1 of the 1920 Giro d'Italia.

Career 
He started his career as a track cyclist in Marseille, where he moved with his family. He accomplished the greatest achievements in his career in the years 1919–1921, namely:

 1919
 3rd place in the Milan-San Remo race
 2nd place in the Milan-Turin race
 1920
 1st place in the 1st stage of the Giro d'Italia race
 1921
 1st place in the Mont Faron race

References

External links
 

1889 births
1973 deaths
Italian male cyclists
Italian Giro d'Italia stage winners
Cyclists from Liguria